Vourvourou is  a village near  Agios Nikolaos, in the Chalkidiki peninsula of northern Greece. It is best known as a holiday destination.

History 
In the 10th century, the area was known as the "land of the Vourvourioi", and was granted to the Xenophontos monastery of Mount Athos. In the 1615, the people of Agios Nikolaos acquired the land, but at the end of the 19th century the monks of Simonopetra monastery sold it to Russian monks, with the result that the latter were forcibly driven away by the local inhabitants.

Vourvourou itself is not a typical village, with no square or history.  Rather it is a 'strip' of shops, tavernas and rooms to rent and is almost an exclusively seasonal area with few year-round residents.

During the 1960s the teaching staff of the University of Thessaloniki developed a holiday resort in a private area also known as Vourvourou.  Designed by Professor Thales Argyropoulos it has become well known for its environment-friendly design and respect for the natural surroundings and has become one of the most prestigious resorts of its kind in Greece. In 1974 excavation at the chapel of Panagia in Vourvourou, uncovered ruins of what is probably the remains of the monastery of Ieromnimon.

See also 
 Vourvourou on halkidiki.com

References

Populated places in Chalkidiki